Live from Philadelphia is the fourth  live album by American singer and songwriter John Legend.

Track listing
"Do U Wanna Ride"
"Heaven"
"Stereo"
"Let's Get Lifted"
"Alright"
"Number One"
"Save Room"
"Where Is the Love"
"I Can Change"
"I Want You (She's So Heavy)"
"Slow Dance"
"Dance to the Music"
"Again"
"P.D.A. (We Just Don't Care)"
"Feel Like Makin' Love Medley"
"Used to Love U"
"Ordinary People"
"Coming Home"
"Show Me" (Encore)
"So High" (Encore)

Charts

Weekly charts

Year-end charts

Certifications

References

2008 live albums
John Legend albums